Almere Oostvaarders is a railway station in Almere, Netherlands. It is located 29 km east of Amsterdam, on the Amsterdam - Almere - Lelystad main line. It is approximately 3 km northeast of the Almere city centre. Almere Oostvaarders railway station opened on 12 December 2004.

Before the station was built the commuter train Amsterdam-Almere Oostvaarders terminated at Almere Buiten. The four tracks at Almere Oostvaarders were used by the driver walking through the train to start a service again at Almere Buiten.

The station is in the centre of the 'Oostvaarders' development, on the edge of Almere-Buiten. It is situated near the Oostvaarders nature reserve, the Oostvaardersplassen. The station is located on a viaduct with 4 tracks and has 4 platforms, which are island platforms.

When Almere Oostvaarders opened, a new curve was built, so trains could go from Almere to Hilversum and Utrecht without the necessary change of trains at Weesp. The curve is between the stations Almere Poort and Naarden-Bussum.

Train services
, the following train services call at this station:
Local Sprinter 4300 services Hoofddorp - Schiphol Airport - Amsterdam Zuid - Almere Oostvaarders
Local Sprinter 4600 services The Hague - Schiphol Airport - Amsterdam - Weesp - Almere - Lelystad - Zwolle
Local Sprinter 4900 services Utrecht Centraal - Hilversum - Almere Oostvaarders

Bus services
"Buitenmetro" M2. Stripheldenbuurt-Oost - Station Oostvaarders - Oostvaardersbuurt - Seizoenenbuurt - Station Buiten - Molenbuurt - Bouwmeesterbuurt - Waterwijk - Station Centrum
"Parkmetro" M7. Station Oostvaarders - Eilandenbuurt - Regenboogbuurt - Station Buiten - Bloemenbuurt - Faunabuurt - Landgoederenbuurt - Verzetswijk - Station Parkwijk - Station Centrum

External links
NS website 
Dutch Public Transport journey planner 

Oostvaarders
Railway stations opened in 2004
Railway stations on the Flevolijn